Stojadin Rajković (born 26 May 1963) is a retired Serbian football defender and later manager.

References

1963 births
Living people
Serbian footballers
FK Dinamo Pančevo players
Grazer AK players
TSV Hartberg players
Kapfenberger SV players
Association football defenders
Serbian expatriate footballers
Expatriate footballers in Austria
Serbian expatriate sportspeople in Austria
Austrian Football Bundesliga players
Austrian football managers
Grazer AK managers